The 1897 Army Cadets football team represented the United States Military Academy in the 1897 college football season. In their first season under head coach Herman Koehler, the Cadets compiled a 6–1–1 record and outscored their opponents by a combined total of 194 to 41. The Cadets suffered their only loss against Harvard by a 10 to 0 score and played Yale to a 6–6 tie. The Army–Navy Game was not played in 1897.

Three Army Cadets were honored on the 1897 College Football All-America Team. Halfback William Nesbitt received second-team honors from Walter Camp. Quarterback Leon Kromer received second-team honors from the New York Sun. Tackle Wallace Scales received second-team honors from Walter Camp and The New York Sun.

Schedule

References

Army
Army Black Knights football seasons
Army Cadets football